1977 college football season may refer to:

 1977 NCAA Division I football season
 1977 NCAA Division II football season
 1977 NCAA Division III football season
 1977 NAIA Division I football season
 1977 NAIA Division II football season